The Railroad Revitalization and Regulatory Reform Act of 1976, often called the "4R Act," is a United States federal law that established the basic outlines of regulatory reform in the railroad industry and provided transitional operating funds following the 1970 bankruptcy of Penn Central Transportation Company. The law approved the "Final System Plan" for the newly created Conrail and authorized acquisition of Northeast Corridor tracks and facilities by Amtrak.

The Act was the first in a series of laws which collectively are described as the deregulation of transportation in the United States. It was followed by the Airline Deregulation Act (1978), Staggers Rail Act (1980), and the Motor Carrier Act of 1980.

Background
Following the massive bankruptcy of the Penn Central in 1970, Congress created Amtrak to take over the failed company's intercity passenger train service, under the Rail Passenger Service Act. Congress passed the Regional Rail Reorganization Act of 1973 (the "3R Act") to salvage viable freight operations from Penn Central and other failing rail lines in the northeast, mid-Atlantic and midwestern regions, through the creation of Conrail. Conrail began operations in 1976.

Summary
 Implementation of the Conrail "Final System Plan," as formulated by the United States Railway Association, and which specified the rail lines that Conrail would receive
 Provision of operating funds for Conrail, which had not received direct federal funds under the 3R Act. Initial funding for 1976 was $484 million (in 1986 dollars)
 Amtrak could acquire rights of way, tracks, and related facilities (such as train stations) for the Northeast Corridor (NEC) rail line between Washington, D.C. and Boston
 Initial funds were provided to Amtrak of approximately $85.2 million for the NEC acquisition.
 Federal regulation of railroads was reduced significantly for the first time since passage of the 1887 Interstate Commerce Act.

The "Declaration of policy" in the Act (Section 101), was as follows:

The financial assistance provisions of the act were largely palliative and transitional. They were extended on the condition that changes in the regulatory system governing railroads be enacted, with the hope that a regulatory system which gave railroads more freedom in pricing and service arrangements, subject to greater competitive constraints, would yield a more viable industry and better service for its users. Studies of the legislative history of the Act indicate that the Gerald Ford administration secured the regulatory provisions only by threatening a veto of any act containing financial assistance for railroads but no reform of the regulatory system.

The changes in regulation provided for were as follows:
Section 202 provided that rail rates would not be considered ‘unjust and unreasonable’ if they exceeded long run marginal costs (on the low side) and (as to the high side) applied to traffic as to which the railroads did not have ‘market dominance’ (a term related to concepts of monopoly power). The railroads were to be allowed to explore this ‘zone of reasonableness’, with presumptions against suspension or challenge of proposed rates, at a rate of 7% per year.
Section 206 provided for, in substance, contract rates for transactions involving an investment of more than $1 million.
Section 207 provided the Commission with authority to exempt from regulation entirely categories of traffic, upon making findings in substance that regulation was unnecessary.
Section 208 prohibited collective rate making on movements which a rail carrier could handle entirely on its own system (‘single line rates’), and buttressed the right of ‘independent action’ by rail carriers.

In a signing statement, President Ford stated,

Reaction

Many members of the ICC strongly opposed the Act. The regulatory provisions had been enacted over several commissioners' objections, and the Commission's implementation of the Act initially had little impact on the way the rail industry functioned.

When President Jimmy Carter nominated A. Daniel O'Neal, originally appointed by President Richard Nixon, to chair the ICC, O’Neal began to develop the possibilities for opening up the rail market to competition. Also, in 1978 a group of major railroads formed an organization called TRAIN (Transportation by Rail for Agricultural and Industrial Needs) to support further deregulation of the industry. The carriers' perception was that with collective rate making limited, and a Commission apparently more interested in letting their rates go down than go up, the regulatory system no longer favored them.

Large shippers of goods by rail also wished to have more flexibility in the rail market. The result of this alignment between carriers, the shippers, and the Carter administration’s ICC, was the Staggers Act of 1980. The Staggers Act extended the principles of the 4R Act. One of the key changes from the 1976 Act was allowance of secret contracts between carriers and shippers, not limited to large-investment situations and not effectively subject to regulatory review. According to former Congressional Budget Office analyst Christopher Barnekov, such contracts allowed rail carriers and shippers much to develop more efficient transport arrangements.

See also
History of rail transport in the United States

References

External links 
 Full text of the law, Legal Information Institute
 Full text of the law, U.S. Government Publishing Office

1976 in law
United States railroad regulation
United States federal transportation legislation
1976 in rail transport
History of rail transportation in the United States